"Yesterday Went Too Soon", is a single from UK rock band Feeder, released near the end of summer 1999. It was the third single from the album of the same name. It was their first single to reach the UK top 20.

When MTV 2 came to the UK after the launch of digital television in 2000, the promo video was in heavy rotation.

On the MC (cassette) format of the single, the track "Oxidize", was made available on CD for the first time in 2004 via the b-sides album Picture of Perfect Youth.

The track was a critical success, and was named Melody Maker's "Single Of The Week". The song was about a relationship ending, and the person waiting for his partner to return to him.

Track listing

CD1

 "Yesterday Went Too Soon" (edit)
 "Getting To Know You Well" - 3:20
 "Tomorrow Shine" - 5:07

CD2

 "Yesterday Went Too Soon" - 4:20
 "Rubberband" - 3:45
 "Slider" - 3:25

MC

 "Yesterday Went Too Soon" - 4:20
 "Oxidize" - 3:50
 "Tomorrow Shine" - 5:07

References

1999 singles
Feeder songs
The Echo Label singles
1998 songs
Songs written by Grant Nicholas